The Nochiya are an Assyrian tribe that were based in and around the district of Şemdinli (Beyyurdu and Öveç), in the province of Hakkari, Turkey.

People 
The Assyrians of the Nochiya Region were simple farmers who owned cattle and grew food. They were known particularly for their fine tobacco, which was their main source of income along with herding sheep. Prayer and fasting were strictly observed in the villages of the Nochiya Assyrians. An Englishman visiting the Nochiya Region in the late 19th century noted that "there is perhaps no Assyrian district where simple piety and loyal devotion to the church of their fathers is more beautifully seen than in Nochiya". Nochiyaye were and are still today most famous for their Eastern Rite faith and for being the guardians of the Assyrian Church of the East's canon laws, which they have faithfully preserved.

Religion
There were at least six monasteries and more than 40 churches within the Nochiya Region. The Nochiyaye were best known for their adherence to the Assyrian Church of the East faith; because of this, religious customs such as Lent and prayer were strictly observed. The Mar Ishu Monastery in the village of Mar Ishu was a theological school for priests and was run by the Metropolitans of Shamizdin, who would not tolerate any changes to the church's canon laws.

An Englishman visiting the Nochiya Region in the late 19th century noted that "there is perhaps no Assyrian district where simple piety and loyal devotion to the church of their fathers is more beautifully seen than Nochiya".

There were other important religious figures in the tribe, including two bishops, four archdeacons, twelve priests, and a large number of deacons distributed among the clans. To this day, the majority of the priests and deacons within the Assyrian Church belong to the Nochiya tribe, including the Patriarch Mar Dinkha IV.

Saint Mar Yosip Khnanisho XII

The 12th and the last of the metropolitans the Matran family donated to the church was Mar Yosip Khnanisho, who died on July 3, 1977 in Baghdad, Iraq. At an early age, he was aware for the sublime position he was dedicated, thus he had learned by heart the complete Eucharistic rites, performed in the church by a deacon or priest. He was tutored adequately by a learned scholar, Rev. Rehana, his father's uncle, who was well versed in the Aramaic, Russian and Turkish languages and an authority in Eastern theology. Rev. Rehana was the head of the Seminary in Mar Ishu Monastery and he taught classes to a number of students studying for the priesthood. From this seminary many graduated to become bishops and priests in various dioceses and parishes.

At age twelve, Mar Yosip was ordained a deacon. By 1912 Mar Yosip had already acquired a thorough knowledge of theology therefore he was found to be well suited to be ordained a priest. In the year 1914, at the beginning of World War I, he was sent as a delegate, representing the Metropolitan Mar Iskhaq Khnanisho, to participate in a most important meeting called by Mar Benyamin Shimon XIX, the Catholicos Patriarch at the patriarchal cell in Qudchanis, Turkey, to discuss the effects of the World War on the Church and the nation and prepare for the changes that were expected to take place. While there he was consecrated a bishop on August 10, 1914, by the patriarch and was appointed as assistant to the patriarch.

He remained in Qudchanis until 1916 when the Assyrians had to leave their homeland and possessions in consequence of the Great War. After the treacherous assassination of the Patriarch Mar Benyamin Shimon XIX in 1918, Mar Yosip assumed to a great extent, the leadership of the nation, until the Assyrians arrived in the refugee camps, set up by the Red Cross and League of Nations, at Baqubah, Iraq in 1918. In December 1918 he was elevated to the rank of Metropolitan in Baghdad by Patriarch Mar Paulos Shimon XX.

When Shimun XXI Eshai, the Catholicos Patriarch, was exiled in 1933 by the monarchial regime of Iraq, Mar Yosip Khnanisho was entrusted with the church administration in Iraq and the Middle East.

In 1973, when Shimun XXI Eshai resigned his position as the Catholicos Patriarch, Mar Yosip Khnanisho was vested with responsibilities of administering the Church of the East throughout the world. At the same time, the Iraqi government issued a Republican decree appointing Mar Yosip Khnanisho as the supreme head of all the Assyrians in Iraq.

On July 3, 1977, at 1:10 PM Saint Mar Yosip Khnanisho X died in Baghdad, Iraq. His death coincides with the feast celebrated every year in memory of Mar Tooma Shlikha (St. Thomas the Apostle).

Notable Nochiyaye

Religious Figures
Assyrian Church of the East:
Saint Mar Yosip Khnanisho X - Mar Ishu, NOCHIYA - Last Metropolitan of Shamizdin, d.1977, Baghdad
Mar Dinkha IV - Darbandokeh, Iraq - Patriarch
Mar Emmanuel Yosip - Darbandokeh, Iraq - Bishop, Diocese of Canada

Political Activists
Dr. Emanuel Kamber - Darbandokeh, Iraq - Previous Secretary General, Assyrian Universal Alliance, Chicago
Kurdistan Democratic Party:
Fawzi Hariri - Harir, Iraq - ‘Iraqi Minister for Industry' & 'Elected INC Member'
Sargis Aghajan - Diyana, Iraq

Others
Dr. Emanuel Kamber - Darbandokeh, Iraq - Professor at Western Michigan University
Geniro - Tees, - Darbandokeh, Pop Singer, Canada brother of Ninos Dikho

See also
 Jilu
 Tyari
 Halmon
 Ashitha

References

 
Assyrian tribes
Hakkari

es:Nochiya
ku:Nêwçiya